Sacred Bones Records is an American independent record label founded in 2007 and based in Brooklyn, New York.  The label has released recordings from artists including Zola Jesus, David Lynch, John Carpenter, Spellling, Blanck Mass, Crystal Stilts, Marissa Nadler, The Men, Caleb Landry Jones, Molchat Doma, DJ Muggs and The Soft Moon.

In 2011, British music magazine The Wire described the label as "one of the best American labels in recent years", and Billboard Magazine listed Sacred Bones among the 50 best indie labels in America.

In 2022, the label began reissuing records by Townes Van Zandt & Blaze Foley on 8 Track

Label roster

Amen Dunes
Black Marble
Blanck Mass
Blank Dogs
The Bitters
Boris
Caleb Landry Jones
Case Studies
Cheena
Children's Hospital
Constant Smiles
Jack Cruz
Crystal Stilts
Cult of Youth
Daily Void
Daniel Davies
David Lynch
Dean Hurley
Dead Luke
Destruction Unit
DJ Muggs
Dream Police
Effi Briest
Exploded View
Factums
Föllakzoid
The Fresh & Onlys
Gary War
Jenny Hval
John Carpenter
Hilary Woods
His Electro Blue Voice
Human Eye
The Holydrug Couple
Hunchback 
The Hunt 
Indigo Sparke
Institute
Jozef van Wissem & Jim Jarmusch
Këkht Aräkh
Led Er Est
Lust for Youth
Marching Church
Marissa Nadler
Max Elliott
Medication
The Men
Molchat Doma
Mort Garson
Moon Duo
Naked on the Vague
Nerve City
Nice Face
Pharmakon
The Pink Noise
Pop. 1280
Prolife
Psychic Ills
The Rebel
Religious Knives
Slug Guts
The Soft Moon
Spirit Photography
Spellling
SQÜRL
Thou
Thought Gang
Timmy's Organism
Trouble
Uniform
Uniform & The Body
Vermillion Sands
Woods
Vår 
Vive la Void
Wymond Miles
Zola Jesus

Selected reissues
13th Chime
Carl Simmons
Cultural Decay
David Lynch: Eraserhead Original Soundtrack Recording 
Julee Cruise
Mort Garson - Mother Earth's Plantasia
Part 1
Psychic TV
Rose McDowall
The Thing: Soundtrack
Trop Tard
UV PØP
Various Artists: Killed by Deathrock, Vol. 1 compilation
Various Artists: Killed by Deathrock, Vol. 2 compilation
Vex

See also
List of record labels

References

External links
 Official website

 
American independent record labels
Experimental music record labels
Indie rock record labels
2007 establishments in the United States